WTSA (1450 AM, "99.5 The Beast") is a radio station licensed to serve Brattleboro, Vermont. It first signed on in 1950.

The station was assigned the WTSA call letters by the Federal Communications Commission on August 1, 1986. WTSA signed on April 19, 1950, as a sister station to WKBR in Manchester, New Hampshire. The station was first in Brattleboro and was positioned to serve Vermont, New Hampshire and Massachusetts. WTSA was sold to the Puritan Radio Group, and later to McGavern/Guild. McGavern changed the middle of the road format to top 40 in the mid 1960s. WTSA was always the most popular station in the region, being a strongly personality directed format. In 1967 WTSA had a Hooper Index listenership of 49.7 market share out of a 13-station measure. WTSA-FM would be added in 1975, and with ownership changes, the format on AM was moved to FM.

On March 4, 2019, WTSA changed their format from sports to active rock, branded as "99.5 The Beast" (simulcast on FM translator W258DQ Brattleboro).

Previous logo

References

External links
 WTSA AM official website

TSA
Radio stations established in 1950
1950 establishments in Vermont
Active rock radio stations in the United States